Stevenson Island is a small island 120 m high, lying at the east side of Colbeck Archipelago, 2 nautical miles (3.7 km) northeast of Cape Simpson. Discovered in February 1931 by the British Australian New Zealand Antarctic Research Expedition (BANZARE) under Mawson. He named it for Captain J.B. Stevenson, Royal Navy, a member of the Australian Aurora Committee, 1916–17.

See also 
 List of Antarctic and sub-Antarctic islands

Islands of Mac. Robertson Land